This is a list of the mammal species recorded in Laos.

Order: Artiodactyla (even-toed ungulates & cetaceans)

Order: Carnivora (carnivorans)

Order: Chiroptera (bats)

Order: Eulipotyphla (Hedgehogs, shrews, moles and relatives)

Order: Lagomorpha (lagomorphs)

Order: Pholidota (pangolins)

Order: Primates

Order: Proboscidea (elephants)

Order: Rodentia (rodents)

Order: Scandentia (treeshrews)

Locally extinct 
The following species are locally extinct in the country:
Indian hog deer, Axis porcinus possibly extirpated
Wild water buffalo, Bubalus arnee
Sumatran rhinoceros, Dicerorhinus sumatrensis
Javan rhinoceros, Rhinoceros sondaicus

See also
List of birds of Laos

References

External links

.
Mammals
Laos
 Laos
Laos